Sulayman ibn al-Hafiz was the oldest son of the eleventh Fatimid caliph and imam of Hafizi Isma'ilism, al-Hafiz. Designated as heir-apparent, he served as vizier for two months in 1134, before his death in office.

Life
Sulayman was the oldest son of the Fatimid caliph al-Hafiz. Al-Hafiz had come to the throne under dubious circumstances, and was not the son of the previous caliph, al-Amir, but his cousin. This event created a crisis of legitimacy, and a schism among the Isma'ili faithful, dividing them into the Hafizi and Tayyibi branches.

After disposing of the too powerful vizier Abu'l-Fath Yanis, al-Hafiz initially ruled without a vizier who might threaten his throne. In 1134, al-Hafiz appointed Sulayman both as heir-apparent and vizier. It was the first time that a Fatimid prince, or even the heir-apparent, had been appointed to the vizierate. With this unusual conferment of plenipotentiary power in Sulayman's hands, the caliph intended to solidify the succession in his line, but Sulayman died two months later. 

This once more called into question the supposed infallibility of al-Hafiz as the Isma'ili imam. Sulayman's younger brother Haydara was immediately appointed as heir and vizier, but this provoked the jealousy of another of al-Hafiz's sons, Hasan, who rebelled against his brother and father and seized the vizierate, only to be killed after a brief reign of terror by a military strongman, Bahram al-Armani.

References

Sources

 
 
 

1134 deaths
Sons of Fatimid caliphs
Viziers of the Fatimid Caliphate
12th-century people from the Fatimid Caliphate
Heirs apparent who never acceded
12th-century Ismailis